Troels Lyby (born 15 October 1966) is a Danish actor. He made his big break in Hella Joof's film En kort en lang, but had previously acted in Let's Get Lost by Jonas Elmer and Lars von Trier's The Idiots. Since then, he has been in Okay and Jul i Valhal.

Troels Lyby was also in the Danish sitcom .

Troels Lyby won the Robertprisen for best supporting actor in 2002 for the film En kort en lang and the Robertprisen for best actor in 2006 for the film Anklaget.

Filmography (selected) 
 2016 – What We Become – Dino
 2013 – Kvinden i buret  (2013) – Hardy
 2012 –  – Big J
 2011 – The Reunion
 2009 – Headhunter
 2008 –  – Jimmy (voice)
 2008 –  – Theodor
 2008 – Sommer – Svend Andersen (TV 1 episode)
 2007 – Forbrydelsen – Erik Salin (3 episodes)
 2007 – Guldhornene – Asbjørn
 2007 –  – Tobias
 2007 –  – Bent
 2006 – Krøniken – Søren (4 episodes) (TV)
 2006 – " – Obstetrician
 2006 – "Fidibus – Advokat
 2006 – 
 2005 – Jul i Valhal – Asbjørn (2 episodes) (TV)
 2005 – Anklaget – Henrik
 2004 – Twelfth Night (holiday) – Tobias Hikke (TV)
 2003 – 2004 Forsvar – Claus 'CC' Christensen (3 episodes) (TV)
 2004 –  – Lars
 2003 –  – Ole
 2002 –  – Henrik (1 episode) (TV)
 2002 – Okay – Kristian
 2001 – En kort en lang – Jørgen
 2001 –  – Per Toftlund (TV)
 2001 – Mistænkt (VG) – Brian Tulberg
 2000 – Före stormen – Læreren
 2000 –  (TV) – Per
 2000 – Edderkoppen (TV miniseries) – Walter
 1998 – Strisser på Samsø – Christian Hammer (1 episode) (TV)
 1998 – Skæbneloddet – Christian Hammer (TV episode)
 1998 – The Idiots (Danish title: "Idioterne") – Henrik
 1997 – Let's Get Lost – Thomas
 1995 – Debut
 1995 – Who's Hitler? – Mann i boksershorts (TV)
 1994 – Riget (TV miniseries) – Hook

External links 
 

1966 births
Living people
Best Actor Robert Award winners
Danish male television actors
Danish male film actors
20th-century Danish male actors
21st-century Danish male actors
People from Aarhus